The MMN-2 is a Georgian Claymore type directional anti-personnel fragmentation mine. The mine projects fragments in a forty-five degree horizontal arc to a casualty radius of forty meters.

Specifications
 Weight: 2.26 kg
 Length: 168 mm
 Depth: 60 mm
 Height: 238 mm
 Explosive content: 0.6 kg

References
 Jane's Mines and Mine Clearance 2005-2006

Anti-personnel mines